Leaders of political parties in the United States may refer to:

Chairpersons of party national committees
Democratic National Committee#List of DNC Chairs
Green National Committee#Steering committee
Libertarian National Committee#List of LNC Chairs
Republican National Committee#Chairmen and Chairwomen of the Republican National Committee

Party leaders in the United States Congress
Party leaders of the United States Senate
Party leaders of the United States House of Representatives